The Nguni is a cattle breed indigenous to Southern Africa. A hybrid of different Indian and later European cattle breeds, they were introduced by pastoralist tribes ancestral to modern Nguni people to Southern Africa during their migration from the North of the continent. 

The cattle breed is medium-sized and adapted to grazing on the highveld.

Characteristics
Nguni cattle are known for their fertility and resistance to diseases, being the favourite breed amongst the local Bantu-speaking people of southern Africa (South Africa, Eswatini, Namibia, Zimbabwe, Botswana, and Angola). They are characterised by their multicoloured skin, which can present many different patterns, but their noses are always black-tipped. 

They are a principal form of Sanga cattle, which originated as hybrids of Zebu and humpless cattle in East Africa. DNA analyses have confirmed that they are a combination of Bos indicus and Bos taurus, that is a combination of different Zebu and European cattle breeds.  

They are characterised by low cervicothoracic humps, in front of the front legs, instead of the high thoracic humps of pure Zebu. Besides the various colour patterns, these animals present a variety of horn shapes. 

All different combinations were catalogued in the beginning of the century by a South African herdmaster. This work inspired the Nguni Cattle Register, a compilation of terms to describe in full a Nguni cow or bull. The cattle are medium-sized, with bulls weighing between 500 and 600 kg, while cows weigh between 300 and 400 kg.

Origins
The ancestors of Nguni cattle were brought by ancestors of Nguni (Zulu, Xhosa, Ndebele, Swazi people, etc.), during their postulated migration to the south of Africa.

See also
 Nguni shield
 Cowhide

References

Cattle breeds
Cattle breeds originating in South Africa
Nguni